The Riverton Ward Meetinghouse, in Riverton, Utah, was built in beginning in 1899, and was demolished in 1940

It was designed by Richard K.A. Kletting.

References

Salt Lake County, Utah
Meetinghouses of the Church of Jesus Christ of Latter-day Saints in Utah
Buildings and structures demolished in 1940